The Electric Tour is synthpop duo Pet Shop Boys' 2013–2015 world tour in support of their two albums Elysium and Electric. The first leg started on 22 March and ended in October in Mexico. The second leg of the tour was announced in January 2014, starting at the Coachella festival in California in April. A third leg of the tour was announced in February 2015, starting at the Festival Contempopranea in Badajoz, Spain. Notably, the tour was announced on 5 December 2012 even before the announcement of Electric, the album bearing the same name with the tour.

Concept
The show consists of the band along with two dancers performing in front of a huge screen.

The screen often projects the silhouettes of band members Neil Tennant and Chris Lowe morphing into different colours or shapes according to each song, but it also projects other types of videos, such as visiting places of the world via Google Earth during Somewhere.

The show starts with Axis and ends, on most dates, with Vocal, which are respectively the opening and closing tracks of their Electric album.

The set list has some short interludes or extended instrumental parts to allow the band to go offstage, change costumes and come back. Those moments could also be considered as links between one act and another in the show.

The dancers always have their faces covered in some way. They appear for the first time during the interlude preceding I Wouldn't Normally Do This Kind of Thing and finish off on Vocal, both times wearing big minotaur masks.

Reviews
Alex Needham of The Guardian said of the Sydney shows, "Like a lot of their long career, the show walks a tightrope between pop and art, silliness and profundity. Much of it sees the Pet Shop Boys perform in extravangant outfits (fluorescent orange jackets; a disco ball which entirely covers Lowe’s head) in front of specially-made films ranging from Google Earth images for Somewhere to equations for Opportunities (Let’s Make Lots of Money)."

Robert Collins of CTV British Columbia said of the Vancouver show, "... they comprehensively proved how ideas are at the heart of pop stardom."

Setlist

Tour dates

References

2013 concert tours
2014 concert tours
2015 concert tours
Pet Shop Boys concert tours